The MG 15 was a German 7.92 mm machine gun designed specifically as a hand-manipulated defensive gun for combat aircraft during the early 1930s.  By 1941 it was replaced by other types and found new uses with ground troops.

History 
The MG 15 was developed from the MG 30, which was designed by Rheinmetall using the locking system invented by Louis Stange in the mid to late 1920s. Though it shares the MG 15 designation with the earlier gun built by Bergmann, the MG 15nA (for neuer Art, meaning new model having been modified from an earlier design) has nothing in common with the World War II gun except the model number. The World War I gun used a tipping lock system while the WWII aircraft gun uses a rotating bolt/lockring. The World War II MG 15 was used in nearly all Luftwaffe aircraft with a flexible-mount defensive position.

It was a modular design with various attachments that could be quickly attached or removed. The bolt mechanism acted as a traditional open-bolt machinegun design, in which the bolt will slam forward when empty, and require re-cocking either before or after a new magazine was fitted in order to be able to fire again. 

The MG 15 fires from an open bolt, meaning that the bolt stays back when the gun is ready to fire, and is thus unsuitable for "through the propeller" synchronized forward firing on a fuselage mount. Pulling the trigger releases the bolt and allows it to go forward, stripping a round from the magazine. The bolt continues pushing the round into the chamber and locks up when the lockring rotates and locks the bolt and barrel extension together. At this point the trip lever releases the firing pin and the gun fires. Recoil pushes the barrel, lock and bolt backwards until the lockring hits a cam that rotates it unlocking the bolt and barrel. Inertia carries the bolt backwards until the base of the fired case hits the ejector, flinging the empty out of the receiver. If the trigger is held down the cycle will continue. If the trigger is released the bolt will remain in the rearward position.

The "saddle-drum" magazine was so called because it straddled the gun, with two inversely symmetrical spiral drums that fitted on either side of the receiver. The 75 rounds of ammunition (not 150 as is often mistakenly claimed) was shared evenly by both drums and as the gun fired, converged under spring tension towards the centre and from thence passed downwards into the action. The MG 15 having a firing rate of 1000+ rpm could empty the magazine in 4.5 seconds or less, and typical practice was to provide at least 10 spare magazines for each gun on the aircraft.  This of course still left the gunner with the problem of reloading in combat, offering a brief opportunity for enemy fighters to attack with impunity.

Starting in late 1940 the MG 15 was replaced by the belt-fed Mauser 7.92 mm MG 81, MG 81Z (twin-MG 81), MG 131 13 mm machine guns, or MG 151/20 20 mm cannons. As they became redundant in their original role, many MG 15s were modified for infantry use, and a carrying device was also issued that held three of the saddle-drums. (There are a number of pictures showing the guns, both aircraft and ground versions, with 25-round magazines from another machine-gun, the MG 13, however the magazines are not compatible with the MG 15.) The official total of conversions was about 17,648 by January 1, 1944, although the actual number may have been greater.

The license-produced MG 15 was used in the Japanese aircraft as the Type 98 flexible-mounted machine gun and as the Type 1 in the Imperial Japanese Navy. Type 98 machine guns were also used by the Communist forces during the Korean War.

Specifications

Calibre: 7.9 +/- .04 mm
Cartridge: 7.92×57mm Mauser
Round weight: 35.5 grams (cartridge 24 grams, bullet 11.5 grams)
Muzzle velocity: 
Rate of fire: 1000 (possibly up to 1050) rpm
Length :  (without attachments)
Barrel length: 
Weight unloaded with gunsight and cartridge bag: 
Weight loaded with gunsight and cartridge bag: 
75-round magazine unloaded: 
75-round magazine loaded: 
Weight of the 2-part loader:

References

Notes

Sources
  
 MG 15 in private collection, forum site
 Imperial Japanese Weapons

External links

 

7.92×57mm Mauser machine guns
MG 015 machine gun
Light machine guns
Machine guns of Germany
World War II infantry weapons of Germany
World War II infantry weapons of Japan
World War II machine guns
Rheinmetall
Military equipment introduced in the 1930s